The State Register of Heritage Places is maintained by the Heritage Council of Western Australia. , 133 places are heritage-listed in the Shire of Wyalkatchem, of which ten are on the State Register of Heritage Places.

List
The Western Australian State Register of Heritage Places, lists the following ten state registered places within the Shire of Wyalkatchem:

References

Wyalkatchem
Wyalkatchem